The year 2011 saw a number of significant events in spaceflight, including the retirement of NASA's Space Shuttle after its final flight in July 2011, and the launch of China's first space station module, Tiangong-1, in September. A total of 84 orbital launches were conducted over the course of the year, of which 78 were successful. Russia, China and the United States conducted the majority of the year's orbital launches, with 35, 19 and 18 launches respectively; 2011 marked the first year that China conducted more successful launches than the United States. Seven crewed missions were launched into orbit during 2011, carrying a total of 28 astronauts to the International Space Station. Additionally, the Zenit-3F and Long March 2F/G carrier rockets made their maiden flights in 2011, while the Delta II Heavy made its last.

Overview of orbital spaceflight
A total of 84 orbital launches were attempted in 2011, with 78 being reported as successful; 80 launches reached orbit. 35 launches were conducted using Russian and former Soviet rockets, whilst China launched 19 rockets, and the United States launched 18. Europe conducted five launches, India and Japan launched three rockets each, and Iran conducted one launch.

Crewed launches
Seven crewed spaceflights – four Soyuz and three Space Shuttle missions – were launched in 2011, carrying a total of 28 astronauts and cosmonauts into orbit. At the beginning of the year, the Expedition 26 crew was aboard the International Space Station (ISS). The first crewed flight of 2011 was STS-133, the final flight of the Space Shuttle , which launched from the Kennedy Space Center on 24 February. STS-133 carried Leonardo, the final American pressurised module of the ISS, for installation. Discovery returned to Earth on 9 March.

On 16 March, Expedition 27 began aboard the ISS with the departure of the Soyuz TMA-01M spacecraft, which had been docked since October 2010. On 4 April, Soyuz TMA-21 launched to the space station, delivering a further three crewmembers. On 16 May, Space Shuttle  launched to the station on its final mission, STS-134, delivering and installing the Alpha Magnetic Spectrometer, before returning to Earth on 1 June. Expedition 28 began aboard the ISS on 23 May with the departure of Soyuz TMA-20, which had been launched in December 2010, and landed in the early morning of 24 May. Three more crewmembers were launched to the space station aboard Soyuz TMA-02M on 7 June.

After resupplying the space station, Atlantis returned to Earth, landing at Kennedy Space Center's Shuttle Landing Facility at 09:57 UTC on 21 July, and concluding thirty years of Space Shuttle operations. Two days before landing, Atlantis deployed PSSC-2, the last satellite to be launched from a Space Shuttle.

On 29 September, China launched its first space station module, Tiangong-1, which was placed into orbit by a Long March 2F/G carrier rocket flying from the Jiuquan Satellite Launch Centre. Although no crewed missions to Tiangong-1 were conducted in 2011, the uncrewed Shenzhou 8 spacecraft, which was launched on 31 October, docked twice with the module to test its systems in preparation for a successful 2012 crewed docking.

ISS Expedition 28 ended, and Expedition 29 began, with the undocking of Soyuz TMA-21 on 16 September. The launch of Soyuz TMA-22 did not take place until 14 November, having been delayed by reliability concerns surrounding the Soyuz rocket after an uncrewed launch failure in August. A week later, Soyuz TMA-02M undocked, beginning Expedition 30, with the Soyuz spacecraft landing on 22 November. The final crewed launch of the year took place on 21 December, when Soyuz TMA-03M was launched to bring a further three crewmembers to the ISS.

Ten spacewalks were conducted in 2011, all of them by ISS or Space Shuttle astronauts. The final spacewalk by a Space Shuttle crew was conducted on 27 May, during the STS-134 mission.

Robotic exploration
Numerous scientific exploration missions were begun in 2011. In March 2011, the MESSENGER probe became the first artificial satellite of the planet Mercury.  In July, the Dawn spacecraft became the first artificial satellite of the asteroid 4 Vesta. The Mars Science Laboratory – at the time, the largest Mars rover ever constructed – was launched in November, conducting a successful landing on Mars in August 2012.

Launch failures
Six orbital launches failed in 2011, four of which failed to achieve orbit and the remaining two reached lower orbits than expected. The first failure occurred on 1 February, when a Rokot with a Briz-KM upper stage placed Kosmos 2470 into a useless orbit, from which it could not recover. The failure was later traced to a software problem on the Briz-KM.

The next failure occurred on 4 March, when the payload fairing of a Taurus-XL failed to separate, resulting in the rocket being too heavy to reach orbit. The Glory climate research satellite was lost in the failure, along with the KySat-1, Hermes and Explorer-1 [PRIME] CubeSats. The previous Taurus-XL launch, carrying the Orbiting Carbon Observatory in February 2009, also failed due to the fairing not separating.

No more launch failures occurred until mid-August when, over the space of a week, three consecutive orbital launches failed. On 17 August, a Proton-M/Briz-M launched from the Baikonur Cosmodrome, carrying the Ekspress-AM4 communications satellite. In the morning of 18 August, the rocket's upper stage failed to conduct the fourth of five planned burns due to an attitude control system malfunction, leaving the spacecraft in a parking orbit. Later that same day, a Long March 2C launched from Jiuquan carrying the Shijian XI-04 satellite. The second stage vernier engine's mounting suffered a structural failure, resulting in a loss of control, and the rocket failed to reach orbit. Finally, on 24 August, a Soyuz-U carrying the Progress M-12M cargo spacecraft to the International Space Station suffered a third-stage engine failure and also failed to attain orbit.

The final launch failure of 2011 occurred on 23 December, when a Soyuz-2-1b/Fregat carrying the Meridian 5 satellite failed to achieve orbit due to a third-stage malfunction. Debris fell over Novosibirsk Oblast, with one piece hitting a house; however, no casualties were reported.

In November 2011, Russia's Fobos-Grunt Martian sample return probe launched successfully, but experienced a malfunction post-launch and became stranded in orbit. The spacecraft, which was Russia's first attempt at an interplanetary mission since the 1996 Mars 96 mission, disintegrated over the Pacific Ocean on 15 January 2012. China's first Mars probe, Yinghuo-1, which was being carried by the same rocket as Fobos-Grunt, was also lost in the incident.

Orbital launches

|colspan=8 style="background:white;"|

January
|-

|colspan=8 style="background:white;"|

February
|-

|colspan=8 style="background:white;"|

March
|-

|colspan=8 style="background:white;"|

April
|-

|colspan=8 style="background:white;"|

May
|-

|colspan=8 style="background:white;"|

June
|-

|colspan=8 style="background:white;"|

July
|-

|colspan=8 style="background:white;"|

August
|-

|colspan=8 style="background:white;"|

September
|-

|colspan=8 style="background:white;"|

October
|-

|colspan=8 style="background:white;"|

November
|-

|colspan=8 style="background:white;"|

December
|-

|}

Suborbital flights 

|}

Deep space rendezvous

EVAs

Orbital launch statistics

By country
For the purposes of this section, the yearly tally of orbital launches by country assigns each flight to the country of origin of the rocket, not to the launch services provider or the spaceport. For example, Soyuz launches by Arianespace in Kourou are counted under Russia because Soyuz-2 is a Russian rocket.

By rocket

By family

By type

By configuration

By spaceport

By orbit

See also
2011 in science
List of human spaceflights, 2011–2020
Timeline of spaceflight

References

Footnotes

 
Spaceflight by year